The Second Marlin cabinet was the sixth Cabinet of Sint Maarten installed following the achievement of constituent country status of Sint Maarten within the Kingdom of the Netherlands on 10 October 2010. The cabinet was a coalition between the National Alliance, the United St. Maarten Party and the Democratic Party.

Irma and aftermath 
After hurricane Irma hit the island in September 2017, most of the houses on the island were destroyed. While the French part of the island is part of the European Union, the Dutch part is not - and therefore Sint Maarten could not make use of European emergency funds, and was dependent on Dutch aid. The Dutch government made 550 million euro available, but demanded the institution of anti-fraud measures as was already previously agreed with the Sint Maarten government before the aid would be made available. Marlin refused to implement some of those measures though, and this led on November 2 to a motion of no confidence in the Sint Maarten parliament for Marlin and some of his ministers.

After the motion of no confidence was accepted, Marlin tendered the resignation of the cabinet to governor Eugene Holiday and requested elections to be held. As customary, Marlin would lead a caretaker cabinet until a new cabinet would be appointed. However on November 10, another motion of no confidence was accepted in parliament, demanding that Marlin immediately stepped aside. Marlin refused, which led to the Dutch Kingdom Council of Ministers to issue an instruction to the governor to accept the resignation of Marlin as prime minister, and appoint the deputy prime minister Rafael Boasman as his replacement. This was executed by the governor on November 24. The remaining cabinet will continue as caretaker cabinet until the elections early 2018.

After the excusing of Marlin, the cabinet started implementing the demanded measures by the Dutch government, which allowed the transfer of aid funds. The aid funds are mostly distributed through international organizations, such as the World Bank.

Composition
The cabinet is composed as follows:

|rowspan="2"|Prime Minister
|William Marlin
|NA
|20 December 2016
|-
|Rafael Boasman
|USP
|24 November 2017
|-
|Minister of Housing, Physical Planning, and Environment
|Christophe Emmanuel
|NA
|20 December 2016
|-
|Minister of Finance
|Richard Gibson
|NA
|20 December 2016
|-
|Minister of Justice
|Rafael Boasman
|USP
|20 December 2016
|-
|rowspan="2"|Minister of Tourism, Economic Affairs, Transport and Telecommunications
|Rafael Boasman (interim)
|USP
|20 December 2016
|-
|Mellissa Arrindell-Doncher
|USP
|4 April 2017
|-
|Minister of Healthcare, Social Development, and Labor
|Emil Lee
|DP
|20 December 2016
|-
|Minister of Education, Culture, Youth, and Sports
|Silveria Jacobs
|NA
|20 December 2016
|-
|Minister Plenipotentiary of Sint Maarten
|Henrietta Doran-York
|NA
|20 December 2016
|-
|Deputy Minister Plenipotentiary of Sint Maarten
|Hasani Ellis
|DP
|20 December 2016
|}

References

Marlin II
Marlin II
Marlin II
Marlin II